Colonel Thomas Walter Harding (22 January 1843 – 26 March 1927) was a British industrialist and civic figure in Leeds, West Yorkshire, England.

Life
Harding was born in Lille, France, where his Leeds-based father Thomas Richards Harding (1812–1895) had a factory, and was educated at Leeds Grammar School. He built extensions to Tower Works in Holbeck in 1899 and the 1920s and, when City Square was remodelled, proposed and financed the sculptures including the Black Prince.

On 19 May 1869 he married Anne Heycock (1846–1923), daughter of Ambrose Edmund Heath Buckley Butler, ironmaster, of Kirkstall, Leeds; they had a son, born in Leeds in 1870, and a daughter, who died in infancy. Harding used the title "Colonel" after the Leeds Artillery Volunteers gave him the title of Honorary Colonel when he retired after 33 years service in 1893. He was involved in local politics and actively championed the foundation of Leeds City Art Gallery which opened in 1888. He donated a number of pictures to the collection including Scotland Forever! by Butler in 1888. He was Chairman of the Art Gallery Committee between 1887 and 1904.

He was Lord Mayor of Leeds in 1898–99, and was created a Freeman of the City of Leeds in 1903. He moved from his home in Abbey House (originally the Kirkstall Abbey gatehouse) to Hartsholme Hall in Lincolnshire (1902) and Madingley Hall in Cambridgeshire (1906), which he restored. He was appointed High Sheriff of Cambridgeshire and Huntingdonshire in March 1901, and Deputy Lieutenant of Cambridgeshire in April 1901.

Harding was also a writer. He published The Abbot of Kirkstall in 1926, a novel about the Black Prince, John of Gaunt, and  John Wycliffe.

References

Further reading
. Available online to subscribers and via UK public libraries.

1843 births
1927 deaths
Lord Mayors of Leeds
Deputy Lieutenants of Cambridgeshire
High Sheriffs of Cambridgeshire and Huntingdonshire
Liberal Unionist Party parliamentary candidates
French emigrants to the United Kingdom
20th-century English novelists
English historical novelists
Writers of historical fiction set in the Middle Ages